The 1895–96 English Football season fell in what was to be called Aston Villa's golden era. Under George Ramsay's management committee Villa were League champions for the second time in their history.

Season Highlights
Derby County won all 10 home games and led the table at the end of December, with Villa in third. Six consecutive wins took Villa to the top in January and they finished with a four-point margin over Derby, taking the title when Derby dropped a point on 4 April.

Villa paid Burnley £250 for international back James Crabtree in the summer of 1895. Crabtree, Reynolds and Jimmy Cowan formed an outstanding line of half-backs.

John Campbell was a Scot from Celtic where he had won the Scottish championship twice, and later returned to the club.

This was the season Villa lost the FA Cup – literally. Following their FA Cup win in 1894/95, it was on display in a shop window in Birmingham. In the night of 11–12 September 1895 it was stolen and never seen again.
A replica had to be made to the same design. Villa were fined £25. Luckily they had it insured for £200!

James Cowan missed the new year fixture due to his attending (and winning) the illustrious 100 yard New Year Sprint event held at Powderhall, Scotland. The club fined him but he still made a healthy profit due to the prize money!

Final league position

Trivia
Ever-present: Jack Devey

First at top: 30 September

Players used: 18

References

Aston Villa F.C. seasons
1896
Aston